Cadiz is a city in Spain.

Cadiz or Cádiz may also refer to:

Places

Areas of Spain near the city
 Gulf of Cádiz, the arm of the Atlantic nearby
 Bay of Cádiz, the body of water between the city's main island and the mainland
 Bay of Cádiz (comarca), the Spanish county on the mainland beside Cádiz
 Cadiz (province), the Spanish province including Cádiz
 Cádiz (Spanish Congress Electoral District), electoral district for the Congress of Deputies
 Cádiz (Andalusian Parliament Electoral District), electoral district for the Parliament of Andalusia
 Cádiz (wine region), the Spanish terroir around Cádiz

Other places
 Cadiz, Negros Occidental, in the Philippines
 Cadiz, California, in the United States
 Cadiz, Illinois, in the United States
 Cadiz, Indiana, in the United States
 Cadiz, Kentucky, in the United States
 Cadiz, Ohio, in the United States

Sports
 Cádiz CF (Cádiz Club de Fútbol), a soccer team based in Cadiz, Spain.

Facilities and sites
 Nueva Cádiz, an archaeological site in Venezuela
 Cadiz Solar Power Plant, a solar power plant in Cadiz, Negros Occidental, Philippines
 Cádiz solar power plant, a solar power plant in Spain operated by Endesa

Ships and vehicles
 Amoco Cadiz, an oil tanker that sank in 1978, causing the fifth-largest oil spill in history.
 , two ships of the British Royal Navy.

Other
 "Cadiz" (Albéniz), a composition by Isaac Albéniz
 CADIZ, an acronym for the Canadian Air Defense Identification Zone.
 CADiZ, software tools for working with Z notation.
 Cadiz Stradivarius, an antique violin crafted by Antonio Stradivari in 1722.
 Battle of Cádiz (disambiguation), the name of several battles near Cadiz
 Cadiz, Inc., a Los Angeles-based resource-management company, with land in Cadiz, California started by Keith Brackpool and Mark Liggett
 Cadiz (beetle), a genus of leaf beetles
 Jhonder Cádiz (born 1995), Venezuelan footballer

See also 
 Cadix (French: "Cadiz"), the codename of a World War II clandestine intelligence center